Jacques Marie (12 August 1945 – 1999) was a French footballer.

Marie was born in Caen (Calvados). He was a center and captain of RC Lens with whom he reached the final of the Coupe de France in 1975, ten years after losing in his first final with CS Sedan Ardennes.

Playing career
1964-1967: UA Sedan-Torcy
1967-1968: AS Nancy-Lorraine
1973-1977: RC Lens (79 matches in D1, 2 goals)

Awards
Finalist of the Coupe de France: 1965 and 1975
Ligue 1: 1977

External links
Jacques Marie statistics (French)

French footballers
1945 births
1999 deaths
Footballers from Caen

Association football midfielders